Mister World 2014 was the 8th edition of the Mister World competition. It was held at The Riviera International Conference Centre in Torbay, Devon, England on June 15, 2014. Francisco Javier Escobar Parra of Colombia crowned Nicklas Pedersen of Denmark at the end of the event.

Results

Placements

Fast Track Events

Talent

Multimedia Challenge
The winners of the Multimedia Award were announced during the coronation show.

Extreme Challenge
The Extreme Sports Challenge was held on June 3 at Royal Marine Commando Training Centre in Lympstone.

Sports

Fashion & Style
The Fashion & Style Challenge winner was announced during the coronation show.

Teams

Judges
The judges' panel for Mister World 2014 consisted of the following personalities:

Julia Morley – Chairman and CEO of Miss World LTD
Mike Dixon – Musical director
Donna Derby – Choreographer & Stage Director
Andrew Minarik – Hair, Make-up and Stylist expert
Pilín León – Miss World 1981 from Venezuela
Erin Holland – Miss World Australia 2013

Contestants
46 contestants competed for the title

Notes

Debuts

Returns
Last competed in 2007:
 
 

Last competed in 2010:

Crossovers
Manhunt International
 2012:  – Ivans Jevstigņejevs (Top 15)

Mister International
 2014:  – Bohdan Romanovych Yusypchuk (Top 15)

Mister Global
 2016:  – Stewart Kwon Jin-seon

Mister Model International
 2018:  – Diego Marco Conroy Gutiérrez (3rd runner-up)

References

External links
 

2014 beauty pageants
2014 in England
2010s in Devon
Beauty pageants in England
Events in Devon
June 2014 events in the United Kingdom
2014
Torbay